The University of Medicine 2, Yangon (formerly, Institute of Medicine 2) is a university of medicine, located in North Okkalapa, Yangon, Myanmar. The university offers M.B., B.S. degrees and graduate (diploma, master's and doctoral) degrees in medical science. The university is one of the most selective in the country, and accepts approximately 300 students annually based solely on their University Entrance Examination scores.

University of Medicine 2, Yangon is one of five medical schools in Burma recognized by the Educational Commission for Foreign Medical Graduates.

History
The university was opened initially in Mingaladon in the outskirts of Yangon as Medical College 2, as an affiliated college of Yangon University on 15 July 1963. The college became Institute of Medicine 2, an independent university per the University Act of 1964. The Institutes of Medicine were transferred to the Ministry of Health from the Ministry of Education on 1 October 1973 and were supervised by the Department of Medical Education. The Department of Medical Education is now designated as the Department of Medical Sciences as the production of all categories of human resources for health come under its jurisdiction.

In 1963, the 1000-bed Defence Services General Hospital was affiliated as the only teaching hospital of the institute. Affiliated hospitals include North Okkalapa General Hospital (since 1970), Insein General Hospital (since 1973), Thingangyun Model Hospital (since 1996), South Okkalapa Maternal and Child Hospital (since 1998), Mawlamyaing General Hospital in Mon State and Pathein General Hospital in Ayeyarwady Division (since 1997), among others.

In 1997, Field Training Centre for Community Medicine was established in Hlegu Township, which is about 13 miles from the campus and one of the townships of the Yangon Division.

As for the graduate medical training, although only 50 students were accepted each year initially number of uptakes has been increased gradually over the subsequent years.  Since the end of the year 2000, the university has been accepting around 500 uptakes every year.

Postgraduate studies for master's degrees in Anatomy and Physiology started in 1973. Currently, the university has been conducting 6 Diploma courses, 19 Master's degree courses, 26 Doctor of Medical Science courses for clinical disciplines, and 8 Ph.D. courses in Basic Medical Science.

Leadership

Since 1963, UM-2 has been headed by an academic dean known as a rector. Past rectors include:

1963–1967: Ko Ko Gyi
1967–1973: U E
1973–1982: Khin Maung Nyein
1982–1987: Tin Aung Swe
1987–1989: Myo Thwe
1989–1992: Ko Lay
1992–2004: Tha Hla Shwe
2004–2007: Than Nu Shwe
2008–2014: Tint Swe Latt
2014–2015: Zaw Wai Soe
2015–2017: Aye Aung
2017–2021: Aye Tun

Students' Union 
University of Medicine - 2 Students'  Union was founded in 2015 by twelve students. The main purpose of the Students' Union is to represent the students within the institution. The Students' Union takes part in the administrative affairs of the university, academic affairs, and student affairs as well as political movements.

Admissions
The University of Medicine 2, Yangon is one of the most selective schools in the nation as the medical schools continue to be the top choice amongst top students in Myanmar.The students who want the admission to this school must make sure that they are in top 0.02% of the total exam candidates in college entrance exam of the year. The school admits about 300 students per year based on their Basic Education High School (college entrance) exam scores and their regions.

Programs
The university is one of three civil universities and one medical academy in Myanmar that offers undergraduate, graduate, and doctoral degrees.

 Bachelor of Medicine and Surgery M.B., B.S.
 Diploma in Medical Science (Dip.Med.Sc.)
 Master of Medical Science (M.Med.Sc.)
 Doctor of Medical Science (Dr.Med.Sc.)
 Ph.D

Academic Years

Undergraduate curriculum

Foundation Year

1st semester

-Myanmarsar

-English

-Mathematics & statistics

-Physics

-Chemistry

-Botany

-Zoology

2nd Semester

-Structural Principle

-Functional Principle

-Molecular Principle

-Principle of Disease Mechanism

-Principle of Medical Microbiology

-Principle of Drug Therapy

Second year M.B., B.S
Anatomy
Physiology
Biochemistry

Third year M.B., B.S
General pathology
Microbiology
Pharmacology

Students are also posted for 18 weeks each to the medical and surgical wards for clinical training. Exam Marks from the clinical postings are not used in this year. They will be added to the final exam of the final year as “classwork”.

Final year (Part I)
Forensic Medicine (with two days a week morgue posting for teaching during post-mortem examination of real cases in North Okkalapa General Hospital)
Preventive and Social Medicine (with three weeks residential field training in the rural areas and one month of PSM posting which includes healthcare surveying of newly created urban areas and some community care units)
Systemic Pathology and Hematology

Students attend lectures & clinics in Medicine, Surgery, Child Health, Obstetrics & gynecology, and are posted to the various teaching hospitals, including Urban Health facilities as part of Preventive and Social Medicine teaching.

Final year (Part II)
Distinguished into 2 parts : Pre-bloc posting and bloc posting

In pre-bloc posting, students are posted to different specialities for overall 4 months in different hospitals. After each posting, students must take multiple choice questions of each subjects.

Ophthalmology
ENT
Anesthesia
Radiology
Dermatology
Infectious medicine
Psychiatry

In Bloc- posting, students are trained intensively in major speciality through lectures, seminars, presentation, clinical and theory integration and with real patients. Each posting lasts for 3 months and at the end of each posting, students have to take completion tests which composed as written and bedside exam with real patients.
Written exam has multiple choice questions and multiple short questions. Bedside exam has at least 3 patients and students have to take OSCE type exams.

Pediatrics
Medicine
Obstetrics and Gynaecology
Surgery

Final Exam of the final year

Students have to take 2 parts of exam, written and bedside exam. There are about 3 weeks between these two parts.
Written exam lasts for 8 days because each subject has 2 paper of questions as follows.

Medicine paper 1
Medicine paper 2
Surgery paper 1
Surgery paper 2
Paediatrics paper 1
Paediatrics paper 2
Obstetrics paper
Gynaecology paper

Bedside exam lasts for 4 days and students are differentiated into 4 groups and they have to take on different days of each subjects. Each table has two examiners, one from own university and another from other universities of medicine in Myanmar. The university use real patients from teaching hospitals. So, the students are banned from teaching hospitals at least one month before the exam to prevent foreknowledge of cases of the patients who are in potential situation to be placed in the exam.

Medicine bedside exam has

-Imaging section

-Clinical Case section

-OSCE table

-OSCE + history Table

-Communication Table

Surgery bedside exam has

-Imaging section

-Photo section

-History table

-Physical Examination table

Paediatrics bedside exam has

-Photo section

-Case section

-OSCE section 1

-OSCE section 2

-History section

Obstetrics and Gynaecology bedside exam has

-O1 table (History and physical examination of pregnant women or post-partum women)

-O2 table with simulators (Usage of obstetrics instruments such as forceps, Vacuum, And surgical instruments used in LSCS)

-G1 table (History and physical examination of women with gynaecological disease)

-G2 table with instruments used in gynaecology cases such as E&C vacuum or communication table.

The results are usually out in the evening of the final day of the exam. And the students can be addressed as "Doctors" if they pass the exam. So most of them are students who was taking the exam in the morning and became doctors in the evening.

Internship

All students, after successful completion of the Final Part II examination, are continued to train hands-on for a period of one year as house surgeons in the recognized Teaching Hospitals in Yangon. Training periods are:

Only after completion of house-surgeonship M.B., B.S. Degree is offered to the students. Before 1997, the degree was conferred upon completion of the second part of the final year.

Heads of Departments

Department of Chemistry - Daw Ei Ei Khine

Department of Physics - Daw Khin Moh Moh Khaing

Department of Botany - Daw Khin May Myint

Department of Zoology - U Soe Naing

Department of English - Daw Tin Hnin Aung

Department of Burmese - Daw Nan Thaung

Department of Mathematics - Daw Aye Thandar Swe

Department of Anatomy - Prof. Thitsar Aye Maung Than

Department of Physiology - Prof. Sandar Kyaw

Department of Biochemistry - Prof. Myat Mon Khine

Department of Microbiology - Prof. Mon Mon

Department of Pathology - Prof. Nyo Me May Thyn

Department of Pharmacology - Prof. Myat Myat Soe

Department of Forensic Medicine- Prof. Zaw Zaw Oo

Department of Preventive & Social Medicine - Prof. Pa Pa Soe

Department of Medicine - Prof. Nyo Nyo Wah

Department of Surgery - Prof. Moe Myint

Department of OG - Prof. Khin May Thin

Department of Paediatrics - Prof. Tin Moe Phyu

Teaching Hospitals

 North okkalapa General Hospital
 Thingangyun Sanpya General Hospital
 Insein General Hospital
 Yankin Children Hospital
 Ywarthargyi Psychiatric Hospital

Notable alumni

Cynthia Maung
Ni Ni Khin Zaw
Chit Thu Wai
Aye Zan

See also
 List of universities in Myanmar
 Medical Universities (Myanmar)

References

External links
 IM-2 alumi website
 https://www.youtube.com/watch?v=4AaWwe9-q-s

Universities and colleges in Yangon
Medical schools in Myanmar
Educational institutions established in 1963
1963 establishments in Burma